Oxychilus mortilleti is a species of air-breathing land snail, a terrestrial pulmonate gastropod mollusk in the family Oxychilidae.

The specific name mortilleti is in honor of French scientist Louis Laurent Gabriel de Mortillet (1821-1898).

Distribution 
The type locality is Lombardia, northern Italy.

This species is known to occur in:
 Czech Republic - in Bohemia only

References

External links 

"Species summary for Oxychilus mortilleti". AnimalBase.

Oxychilus
Gastropods described in 1859